W. Marvin Smith (August 16, 1895 – October 20, 1948) was a long-time employee and attorney in the U.S. Department of Justice who testified in the Hiss-Chambers Case in August 1948 and then mysteriously died on October 20, 1948.

Background

  Smith graduated from Georgetown University law school.

Career

Smith worked at the Department of Justice for 31 years, as he recalled.

In 1935 or 1936, Alger Hiss had worked with him at the Department of Justice.  At that time, he notarized the transfer of title for Hiss' 1929 Ford Model A Roadster to the Cherner Motor Company, which sold the car same day to one "William Rosen."

Testimony in Hiss Case

  On August 20, 1948, Henry J. Gertler, secretary and treasurer of the Cherner Motor Company, testified before HUAC that W. Marvin Smith had notarized the gift of Hiss's 1929 Ford Model A Roadster to Cherner, which in turn sold it on the same day (July 23, 1936) to William Rosen (who resided at the home of one Benjamin Bialek).  Then Smith testified regarding his signature:  "I say I have no doubt that it is."  Unlike most notaries, Marvin explained, "I have no record because, as I say, I charged no fees. I have not charged a fee since about 1925 — well, I think I got the commission in about 1919 and I charged a few fees at that time and had a record then, but I have not charged since."  Rosen, who testified on August 26 and September 9, 1948,  refused to give testimony, answering most questions with, "I refuse to answer the question on the ground that any answer I may give may tend to incriminate me."  One of his few answers was "This is not my signature."  Cherner later stated "I swear my life on it" that neither he nor Gertler had filled in details for "William Rosen" on the sale.  Rosen and his wife Addie swore they had not been in Washington in 1936 (yet a pharmacist in the Petworth area of Washington claimed to know them).

Personal and death

On October 20, 1948, Smith was found dead in the southwest stairwell of the (then) seven-storey Justice building.  At that time, he worked on the staff of Solicitor General Philip B. Perlman.  Co-workers reported him as "unusually depressed."  He was survived by wife Inez and 21-year-old daughter Jeanne Smith.

Link to Laurence Duggan death

Just after Laurence Duggan's death later that year on December 20, 1948, the Associated Press reported:  The widow of W. Marvin Smith, justice department employee who died in a five storey plunge 2 months ago, expressed belief today that his death was simply an accident.She told a reporter she feels certain it was not a suicide and was not connected in any way with his appearance as a minor witness in congressional hearings.  Smith's death had been recalled in some newspaper accounts of the death of Laurence Duggan in New York City.On Oct. 20, Smith hurtled to his death down circular stairwell in the justice department. That was also the opinion of justice officials.Smith, 53, was an attorney in the solicitor general's office. Last summer, he figure in a minor way in the house committee on un-American activities.

Other "suicides and mysterious deaths"

In 1951, the Chicago Tribune newspaper speculated about "several suicides and mysterious deaths" among spies and government officials mostly related to the Hiss Case, including:

 Nov 1947:  John Gilbert Winant, (suicide). US ambassador to England, following personal depression
 Aug 1948: Harry Dexter White (heart attack)
 Oct 1948: W. Marvin Smith (suicide)
 Dec 1948:  Laurence Duggan (suicide). Regarding Duggan, like Hiss a former State Department official, the newspaper commented, "There was speculation that he might have fallen accidentally or that he might have been thrown from the window, but it was widely believe he committed suicide."  (Duggan fell sixteen stories with one snow boot on.)
 May 1949:  James Forrestal (suicide), first US Secretary of Defense
 1949, Morton Kent, another State Department official, committed suicide after his implication in the trial of Judith Coplon
 Feb 1950:  Laird Shields Goldsborough (suicide).  Goldsborough was a senior editor at Fortune and TIME magazines and former boss of Whittaker Chambers:  he fell out of a ninth-floor building – and left his estate to the Soviet government.
 Apr 1950:  Francis Otto Matthiessen (suicide).  The Harvard professor jumped from the 12 floor of his Boston hotel, according to his sister because of proceedings in the trial of Harry Bridges (defended by Carol Weiss King, who also defended J. Peters, head of the Ware Group).
 Nov 1952:  Abraham Feller (suicide). The UN legal counsel (and friend of Alger Hiss) jumped out his window when Adlai Stevenson Jr. lost the 1952 presidential elections, UN Secretary General Trygve Lie resigned, and a US grand jury and the Senate Internal Security Subcommittee continued investigations into Americans working at the UN.

See also

 Harry Dexter White
 Laurence Duggan
 Alger Hiss
 Whittaker Chambers
 Abraham Feller

References

Year of birth unknown
1948 deaths
United States Department of Justice officials
20th-century American lawyers
1895 births